Ave Maria Island is an island located in Brgy. Lawi, Jordan, Guimaras in the Philippines. The island can be seen from Alubihod Beach resort in Nueva Valencia, Guimaras.

See also

 List of islands of the Philippines

External links
 Ave Maria Island at OpenStreetMap

Islands of Guimaras